Anatoma aspera is a species of minute sea snail, a marine gastropod mollusc or micromollusc in the family Anatomidae.

Description
The length of the shell of this species varies between 1 mm and 3 mm. The shell is usually grayish-white.
Operculum is thin and transparent.

Distribution
This species occurs in European waters, the Mediterranean Sea, the northern Atlantic Ocean, and in the West Indies.

References

 Gofas, S.; Le Renard, J.; Bouchet, P. (2001). Mollusca, in: Costello, M.J. et al. (Ed.) (2001). European register of marine species: a check-list of the marine species in Europe and a bibliography of guides to their identification. Collection Patrimoines Naturels, 50: pp. 180–213 
 Geiger D.L. (2012) Monograph of the little slit shells. Volume 1. Introduction, Scissurellidae. pp. 1-728. Volume 2. Anatomidae, Larocheidae, Depressizonidae, Sutilizonidae, Temnocinclidae. pp. 729–1291. Santa Barbara Museum of Natural History Monographs Number 7.

External links
  Serge GOFAS, Ángel A. LUQUE, Joan Daniel OLIVER,José TEMPLADO & Alberto SERRA (2021) - The Mollusca of Galicia Bank (NE Atlantic Ocean); European Journal of Taxonomy 785: 1–114
 

Anatomidae
Gastropods described in 1844